Amirabad (also Romanized as Amīrābād; also known as Amīrābādkhān-e Manşūrī, Amīrābād Khān Manşūr, and Manşūrābād) is a village in Howmeh-ye Jonubi Rural District, in the Central District of Eslamabad-e Gharb County, Kermanshah Province, Iran. At the 2006 census, its population was 1,219, in 277 families.

References 

Populated places in Eslamabad-e Gharb County